HD 74180 is a binary star in the constellation Vela.  It is approximately 3,200 light years from Earth.  The primary component is a yellow-white F-type supergiant with a mean apparent magnitude of +3.81, with a 10th magnitude companion 37.5 arcseconds distant.

b Velorum has been classified as a suspected α Cygni variable star which varies by only 0.06 magnitude.  There are possible periods near 53, 80, and 160 days, but the variation is largely irregular.  It lies less than a degree from the small open cluster NGC 2645, but is not a member.

References

Velorum, b
074180
Vela (constellation)
Binary stars
Alpha Cygni variables
F-type supergiants
Durchmusterung objects
042570
6513